John Saxby Maples (24 October 1913 – 26 July 1958) was an English first-class cricketer and British Army officer.

Maples was born at Hackney in November 1913. He was educated at Marlborough College, where he served in the Marlborough College contingent of the Officers' Training Corps as a second lieutenant. He served in the Second World War with the Wiltshire Regiment. While serving in British India he made a first-class cricket appearance for Mysore against Madras at Madras in the 1944–45 Ranji Trophy. Batting twice in the match, he was dismissed without scoring by Commandur Rangachari in Mysore's first-innings, while in their second-innings he was dismissed for 5 runs by Ram Singh. Following the war he returned to England, where he began studying at Clare College, Cambridge. He was promoted to the rank of lieutenant in April 1950. Maples also played minor counties cricket for Wiltshire between 1951–53, making nineteen appearances in the Minor Counties Championship. He died at Marlborough in July 1958.

References

External links

1913 births
1958 deaths
People from Hackney Central
People educated at Marlborough College
Wiltshire Regiment officers
British Army personnel of World War II
English cricketers
Karnataka cricketers
Alumni of Clare College, Cambridge
Wiltshire cricketers
Military personnel from Middlesex